The word  (Sanskrit: गण) in Sanskrit and Pali means "flock, troop, multitude, number, tribe, category, series, or class". It can also be used to refer to a "body of attendants" and can refer to "a company, any assemblage or association of men formed for the attainment of the same aims". The word "gana" can also refer to councils or assemblies convened to discuss matters of religion or other topics.

In Hinduism, the s are attendants of Shiva and live on Mount Kailash.

Legends 

There was once a competition between the Devas and Devis that on who should be the leader of the ganas. The objective was to circle once around the Earth and return to Devi Parvati. They traveled in quick pace on their Vahanas (Vehicle), including Ganesha. However, as he was heavy and was riding on a small mouse, his pace was remarkably slow which gave him a disadvantage in winning the race. During the race, when Ganesha wasn't far from Parvati, Sage Narada came and inquired on his journey. The god became irritated as it is believed to be unlucky to encounter a Brahmin at the beginning of a voyage, even though the sage was divine. However, it is also seen as a bad omen when one asks where the traveler was heading when he or she was already on the way to their destination. Nonetheless, Narada soothed him and calmed wrath. Ganesha then explained his anger and his desire to accomplish the objective. The sage consoled to god that as he was a child, the world is equivalent to his mother; thus Ganesha's ability was to circle around Parvati and become the head of Ganas. Parvati soon saw Ganesha and inquired about his management of completing the race. The child told about his discussion with Sage Narada. Parvati became satisfied and claimed him to be the manager of the Ganas.

See also 

 
 Ganachakra
 Ganatantra
 Ganesha
 Genos

References

External links 
 The Ganas: Hooligans of Heaven

Non-human races in Hindu mythology